SDG group is a management consulting firm specialized in business performance management and analytical applications design and development.

References 
 SDG Group & Snaidero partnership for the implementation of Board M.I.T. platform appeared on "DM Review"
 SDG group service of consultancy for Frigicoll described on the Spanish journal "Actualidad Económica" (in Spanish)
 Article appeared on "Il Sole 24 Ore" the leading Financial Newspaper in Italy reporting an interview of a SDG group director (in Italian);
 "Process Management for the Extended Enterprise", Chapter 10 is dedicated to SDG group business methodology
 "Business Intelligence and Knowledge Management", written by Luca Quagini the founder of SDG group

External links 

 

International management consulting firms